A hut is a small, crude shelter.

Hut or The Hut may also refer to:

People 
 Hans Hut ( – 1527), Anabaptist leader
 Piet Hut (born 1952), Dutch-American astrophysicist
 Hut Stricklin (born 1961), American racing driver
 William Hut, Norwegian singer of former band Poor Rich Ones

Places
 Hut Bay, in the Andaman Islands
 Hut Cove, on the Antarctic Peninsula
 Hout, Syria, older spelling for this place

Universities
 Hanoi University of Technology, now Hanoi University of Science and Technology
 Hefei University of Technology, Anhui, China
 Helsinki University of Technology, Finland
 Hunan University of Technology, in Zhuzhou, Hunan, China

Other uses 
 "Hut!", a command in American football
 Hard Upper Torso, spacesuit component
 Home-user test, a product marketing test
 Hopkins Ultraviolet Telescope, a space telescope
 Humla language, a Tibetic language of Nepal (ISO code: hut) 
 Hut Group, a political party in the Åland Islands
 Hut Records, an English record label
 Hutchinson Municipal Airport (Kansas), US, by IATA airport code
 Hutton Cranswick railway station, in England
 The Hut Group, a British online retailer

See also
Huth (disambiguation)
Hutt (disambiguation)
Hoot (disambiguation)